A Passage in Time is the debut studio album released by punk rock band Authority Zero. It was released on September 10, 2002, on Lava Records. The album's singles include "One More Minute" and "Over Seasons", both of which received music videos.

Track listing

Personnel
Authority Zero
Jason DeVore – lead vocals
Bill Marcks – guitar, backing vocals
Jeremy Wood – bass, backing vocals
Jim Wilcox – drums
Jerry Douglas – guest vocals on "Mesa Town" & "Good Ol' Days"

Production and recording
 Dave Jerden – producer, mixing
 Annette Cisnero – engineer
 Elan Trujillo – assistant engineer
 Brad Patrick – management
 Randy Buzzelli - management

Street Promotions
 Dave Leon - Level 1 Promotions
 Jawahar Mohanty - Level 1 Promotions

Notes

2002 debut albums
Authority Zero albums
Lava Records albums
Albums produced by Dave Jerden